Sunset Beach may refer to:

Beaches

Canada 
 Sunset Beach (Vancouver), in Vancouver, British Columbia, Canada

United States 
 Sunset Beach, California (Orange County)
 Sunset Beach in Pacific Grove, California
 Sunset Beach (Treasure Island), Florida
 Sunset Beach (New Jersey), in Cape May, New Jersey
 Sunset Beach (Oahu), in Pupukea, Oahu, Hawaii
 Sunset Beach State Recreation Site, in Oregon
 Sunset Beach, North Carolina
 Sunset Beach, West Virginia

Settlements

Australia 
 Sunset Beach, Western Australia

Canada 
 Sunset Beach, Alberta
 Sunset Beach, Ontario (disambiguation), one of four communities in Ontario, Canada
 Sunset Beach, Saskatchewan

United States 
Sunset Beach, California
Sunset Beach, Oregon
Sunset Beach, New Jersey
Sunset Beach, New York
Sunset Beach, North Carolina
Sunset Beach, Washington
Sunset Beach, Wisconsin

Other
 Sunset Beach (TV series), an American television soap opera from 1997 to 1999
 Sunset Beach Hotel

See also
 Sunset Beach, Alberta (disambiguation)
 Sunset State Beach, near Watsonville, California
 Sunset (disambiguation)